"Baby Cakes" is the only single released by British garage trio 3 of a Kind. It debuted atop the UK Singles Chart on 15 August 2004, becoming the band's only chart hit. Mixmag included "Baby Cakes" on their "40 of the best UK garage tracks released from 1995 to 2005" list. The music video shows the band in a cake shop and contains several double-entendres. A follow-up song, "Wink One Eye" was recorded but was never released.

Background
The song's title was inspired by the 1989 American made-for TV movie Baby Cakes, which starred Ricki Lake in the title role. In the book 1000 UK Number One Hits, member Liana 'Miz Tipzta' Caruana said the song was written in 1998, and she came up with the title after having seen the film that mirrored her own experiences: "The words are written about someone I knew, but generally it's based on the film's love story. Basically, the girl knows the man is 'The One' but he doesn't realise it".

Track listings

Charts and certifications

Weekly charts

Year-end charts

Certifications

Release history

"Bbycakes" version

In February 2022, a version by Guernsey producer Mura Masa, American rapper Lil Uzi Vert and English singer/producer PinkPantheress featuring English rapper Shygirl was released as the third single from Mura Masa's third studio album Demon Time, titled "Bbycakes". The song peaked at number 71 on the UK Singles Chart, becoming Shygirl's first entry on the chart.

Mura Masa described the song as "a mission statement for the vicarious and playful nature that I think popular music needs to be looking to in order to soundtrack those crucial moments of fun and hedonism in an increasingly cynical culture".

Personnel
 Nathan Boddy – mixing engineer
 Liana Caruana – songwriting 
 Nicholas Gallante – songwriting 
 Ema Gaspar – art direction
 John Greenham – mastering engineer
 Lil Uzi Vert – songwriting, vocals
 Mura Masa – production, songwriting, synthesizer, drum programming, engineer
 PinkPantheress – songwriting, vocals
 Marc Portelli – songwriting 
 Shygirl – songwriting, vocals

Charts

References

2004 songs
2004 debut singles
Relentless Records singles
UK garage songs
UK Singles Chart number-one singles